Wesley B. Ogden (December 16, 1818 – June 15, 1896) was a justice of the Supreme Court of Texas from July 1870 to August 1873, and chief justice, August 1873 to January 1874.

Born in Ohio, he moved to Texas in 1849. During his tenure on the state supreme court, he authored a controversial decision voiding the state's 1873 election.

He died in San Antonio on June 15, 1896.

References

Justices of the Texas Supreme Court
1818 births
1896 deaths
19th-century American judges